Leon Hess Comprehensive Secondary School is a secondary school located in Castries, Saint Lucia. The school was established on 26 October 1985 by a donation to the Saint Lucian government from Leon Hess. The school's present principal is Mr. Rohan Lubon and its first principal was Mrs. Jane Bourne. The school's team (house) colours are as follows:

Lewis, which was named after Sir. Arthur Lewis (blue), was changed to the Ellis house on October 2016; which was named after former principal Mr. Rupert Ellis.

Houses 
Jesse which was named after father Charles Jesse (red).

Bourne which was named after Mrs. Jane Bourne (green).

Leon which was named after Mr. Leon Hess (yellow).

Motto 
The school's motto is "Education for Service".

Notable alumni
 Johnson Charles 

 Kenson Casimir

 Julien Alfred

 Menissa Rambally, politician

References

External links
"Leon Hess Comprehensive Secondary School". The Voice. 25 September 2010.
"Leon Hess Comprehensive Secondary School observes 25 years of existence". St. Lucia Government Information Service. 6 October 2010.

Buildings and structures in Castries
Educational institutions established in 1985
Schools in Saint Lucia
1985 establishments in Saint Lucia